1994–95 Belarusian First League was the fourth season of 2nd level football championship in Belarus. It started in July 1994 and ended in June 1995.

Team changes from 1993–94 season
Winners of 1993–94 First League (Obuvshchik Lida) were promoted to Belarusian Premier League. They were replaced by the last placed team of 1993–94 Premier League (Stroitel Starye Dorogi).

Smena Minsk, who finished 15th, relegated to the Second League. They were replaced by two best teams of 1993–94 Second League (Kardan-Flyers Grodno and Ataka-Aura Minsk). The number of participating teams thus was restored to 16.

Before the start of the season Selmash Mogilev were renamed to Transmash Mogilev. During the winter break, Polesye Mozyr changed their name to MPKC Mozyr and KIM-2 Vitebsk changed their name to Kimovets Vitebsk.

Overview
MPKC Mozyr won the tournament and were promoted to the Premier League, as were runners-up Ataka-Aura Minsk. ZLiN Gomel, AFViS-RShVSM Minsk and Stroitel Vitebsk, who finished 14th, 15th and 16th respectively, relegated to the Second League. Santanas Samokhvalovichi, who finished 8th, withdrew to the amateur level after the season due to financial troubles.

Teams and locations

League table

Top goalscorers

See also
1994–95 Belarusian Premier League
1994–95 Belarusian Cup

External links
RSSSF

Belarusian First League seasons
2
2
Belarus